Denis Abdullin (born January 1, 1985) is a Russian former professional ice hockey forward. He played in the Kontinental Hockey League (KHL).

Abdullin played the 2010–11 KHL season with Metallurg Magnitogorsk.

References

External links

1985 births
Living people
Ak Bars Kazan players
Amur Khabarovsk players
Avtomobilist Yekaterinburg players
HC Lada Togliatti players
Metallurg Magnitogorsk players
HC MVD players
HC Neftekhimik Nizhnekamsk players
Russian ice hockey forwards
People from Magnitogorsk
Traktor Chelyabinsk players
HC Vityaz players
Sportspeople from Chelyabinsk Oblast